Conopleura is a genus of sea snails, marine gastropod mollusks in the family Drilliidae.

Distribution
These species are known from the Central Indo-Pacific.

Species
Species within the genus Conopleura include:
 Conopleura latiaxisa Chino, 2011
 Conopleura striata Hinds, 1844
Species brought into synonymy
 Conopleura aliena Smriglio, Mariottini & Calascibetta, 1999: synonym of Tritia lima (Dillwyn, 1817)

References

 Gofas, S.; Le Renard, J.; Bouchet, P. (2001). Mollusca. in: Costello, M.J. et al. (eds), European Register of Marine Species: a check-list of the marine species in Europe and a bibliography of guides to their identification. Patrimoines Naturels. 50: 180-213

External links
 Hinds R. B. (1844-1845). Mollusca. In: The zoology of the voyage of H. M. S. "Sulphur", under the command of Captain Sir Edward Belcher, R. N., C. B., F. R. G. S., etc., during the years 1836-42. London: Smith, Elder and Co. v + 72 pp., 21 pls
 WMSDB - Worldwide Mollusc Species Data Base: family Drilliidae
  Nappo A., Rey X., Pellegrinii D., Bonomolo G., & Crocetta F., 2018 - Revisiting the disjunct distribution of Conopleura Hinds, 1844. Zootaxa 4392 (3)

 
Gastropod genera